Callipero formosa is a species of longhorn beetles of the subfamily Lamiinae. It was described by Monné in 1998, and is known from Brazil.

References

Beetles described in 1998
Acanthocinini